William Biggers may refer to

Billy Biggar (1874–1935), English footballer
W. Watts Biggers (1927–2013), American novelist